Lars Anders Fredrik "Lasse" Mårtenson (24 September 1934 – 14 May 2016) was a Finnish singer, composer, actor, and theater conductor.

Mårtenson was born in Helsinki.  He performed at the Eurovision Song Contest in 1964 with the song "Laiskotellen" ("Idling"). He placed 7th with 9 points. He is best known in his home country as the composer of "Maija from the Storm Skerries", a lyrical tune arranged primarily for piano. His hits include the Finnish version of the song "Jackson" in duet with Carola Standertskjöld, which was included in the list of the songs played in the 2003 Men's World Ice Hockey Championships during the breaks.

In 2011 he published his memoirs, Vågspel, in the Swedish language, and they were translated into Finnish in 2013.

Lasse Mårtenson died in 2016, aged 81.

References

External links
 Mårtenson, Lasse. Biografiskt lexikon för Finland. 

1934 births
2016 deaths
Musicians from Helsinki
Swedish-speaking Finns
Eurovision Song Contest entrants of 1964
Eurovision Song Contest entrants for Finland
20th-century Finnish male singers
Finnish male composers